Power 92 or similar names may refer to:

 CKNG-FM, 92.5 at Edmonton, Alberta, Canada, formerly known as "Power 92" then "Power 92.5"
 CKIS-FM, 92.5 at Toronto, Ontario, Canada, formerly known as "Power 92".
 XHRM-FM, 92.5 at Tijuana, Baja California, Mexico, formerly known as "Power 92-5"
 DWCL, 92.3 at San Fernando, Pampanga, Philippines, in Central Luzon, formerly known as "Power 92.7"

 United States
 KIPR, 92.3 MHz at Pine Bluff, Arkansas, in the Little Rock, Arkansas area
 KTAR-FM, 92.3 MHz at Glendale, Arizona, in the Phoenix area, formerly "Power 92" then "Power 92.3" with the callsign KKFR
 KREV (FM), 92.7 MHz at Alameda, California in the San Francisco area, formerly known as "Power 92.7" with the callsign KBTB
 WSGA (FM), 92.3 at Hinesville, Georgia, in the Savannah, Georgia area, formerly known as "Power 92" with the callsign WSKQ
 KSSK-FM, 92.3 MHz at Waipahu, Hawaii, in the Honolulu area, formerly known as "Power 92" with the callsign KXPW
 WPWX, 92.3 MHz at Hammond, Indiana, in the Chicago area
 WRPW, 92.9 MHz at Colfax, Illinois, in the Bloomington-Normal, Illinois area, and formerly known as "Power 92" then "Power 92.9"
 WZPW, 92.3 MHz at Peoria, Illinois, formerly known as "Power 92" then "Power 92.3"
 KBYO-FM, 92.7 MHz at Farmerville, Louisiana, in the Monroe, Louisiana area, known as "Power 92.7"
 WESE, 92.5 MHz at Guntown, Mississippi, in the Tupelo, Mississippi area
 WMSU, 92.1 MHz at Starkville, Mississippi, in the Columbus, Mississippi area, and known as "Power 92.1"
 KKMT, 92.3 MHz at Ronan, Montana, formerly known as "Power 92" with the callsign KQRK
 WZPR, 92.3 MHz at Nags Head, North Carolina in the Elizabeth City, North Carolina area, formerly known as "Power 92.3"
 KBMW-FM, 92.7 MHz at Kindred, North Dakota, in the Fargo-Moorhead area, formerly "Power 92" with the callsign KPHT
 KSSU (FM), 91.9 MHz at Southeastern Oklahoma State University, in Durant, Oklahoma
 WCAL, 91.9 MHz at California University of Pennsylvania, in California, Pennsylvania, a college radio station
 WJHT, 92.1 MHz at Johnstown, Pennsylvania, formerly known as "Power 92" with the callsign WGLU